Scaphoideus is a leafhopper genus in the subfamily Deltocephalinae.

Economic importance 
Species in the genus are plant pathogens vectors. For instance, the elm yellows is transmitted from infected to healthy trees by the whitebanded elm leafhopper (Scaphoideus luteolus), whereas Scaphoideus titanus is the vector of the grapevine phytoplasma disease flavescence dorée.

Species  
 Scaphoideus abitus
 Scaphoideus acanthus
 Scaphoideus accumulator
 Scaphoideus alboguttatus
 Scaphoideus albomaculatus
 Scaphoideus albosignatus
 Scaphoideus albovittatus
 Scaphoideus alticola
 Scaphoideus anguis
 Scaphoideus angustatus
 Scaphoideus apicalis
 Scaphoideus assamensis
 Scaphoideus asymmetricus
 Scaphoideus atlantus
 Scaphoideus aurantiacus
 Scaphoideus baeticus
 Scaphoideus bicoloratus
 Scaphoideus bifidus
 Scaphoideus bifurcatus
 Scaphoideus bihamatus
 Scaphoideus bimaculatus
 Scaphoideus bipedis
 Scaphoideus biprocessus
 Scaphoideus blennus
 Scaphoideus callus
 Scaphoideus camurus
 Scaphoideus carinatus
 Scaphoideus chelatus
 Scaphoideus cinerosus
 Scaphoideus coloratus
 Scaphoideus conicaplateus
 Scaphoideus consanguineus
 Scaphoideus coronatus
 Scaphoideus crassus
 Scaphoideus curvanus
 Scaphoideus curvatureus
 Scaphoideus curvatus
 Scaphoideus cylindratus
 Scaphoideus cyprius
 Scaphoideus decoratus
 Scaphoideus dellagiustinai
 Scaphoideus densus
 Scaphoideus dentaedeagus
 Scaphoideus dentatestyleus
 Scaphoideus diminutus
 Scaphoideus elegantalus
 Scaphoideus elongatus
 Scaphoideus erythraeous
 Scaphoideus exsertus
 Scaphoideus fanjingensis
 Scaphoideus festivus
 Scaphoideus flavidus
 Scaphoideus fletcheri
 Scaphoideus forceps
 Scaphoideus foshoi
 Scaphoideus frisoni
 Scaphoideus fuscus
 Scaphoideus galachrous
 Scaphoideus geniculatus
 Scaphoideus graciliplateus
 Scaphoideus guizhouensis
 Scaphoideus harlani
 Scaphoideus harpagous
 Scaphoideus hirsutus
 Scaphoideus hongdoensis
 Scaphoideus illustris
 Scaphoideus immistus
 Scaphoideus incisus
 Scaphoideus incognitus
 Scaphoideus inequalis
 Scaphoideus insignis
 Scaphoideus intermedius
 Scaphoideus intricatus
 Scaphoideus inundatus
 Scaphoideus jannus
 Scaphoideus jogensis
 Scaphoideus karachiensis
 Scaphoideus katraini
 Scaphoideus kirti
 Scaphoideus knappi
 Scaphoideus kotoshonis
 Scaphoideus kumamotonis
 Scaphoideus lacyi
 Scaphoideus lamellaris
 Scaphoideus literatus
 Scaphoideus liui
 Scaphoideus longistyleus
 Scaphoideus lophus
 Scaphoideus luteolus Van Duzee
 Scaphoideus maai
 Scaphoideus major
 Scaphoideus malaisei
 Scaphoideus mandevillei
 Scaphoideus matsumurai
 Scaphoideus melanotus
 Scaphoideus menius
 Scaphoideus merus
 Scaphoideus midvittatus
 Scaphoideus minor
 Scaphoideus morosus
 Scaphoideus morrisoni
 Scaphoideus multangulus
 Scaphoideus nigricans
 Scaphoideus nigrifacies
 Scaphoideus nigrisignus
 Scaphoideus nigrivalveus
 Scaphoideus nitobei
 Scaphoideus notatus
 Scaphoideus obscurus
 Scaphoideus obtusus
 Scaphoideus ochraceus
 Scaphoideus opalinus
 Scaphoideus orientalis
 Scaphoideus ornatus
 Scaphoideus palingus
 Scaphoideus pallidiventris
 Scaphoideus paludosus
 Scaphoideus pars
 Scaphoideus pristidens
 Scaphoideus procerus
 Scaphoideus pullus
 Scaphoideus punctulatus
 Scaphoideus quangtriensis
 Scaphoideus rathini
 Scaphoideus relatus
 Scaphoideus rubranotum
 Scaphoideus rubroguttatus
 Scaphoideus rufomaculatus
 Scaphoideus russus
 Scaphoideus sabourensis
 Scaphoideus sculptellus
 Scaphoideus sculptus
 Scaphoideus sensibilis
 Scaphoideus seychellensis
 Scaphoideus shovelaedeagus
 Scaphoideus soleus
 Scaphoideus spiculatus
 Scaphoideus spiniplateus
 Scaphoideus spinulosus
 Scaphoideus stigmaticus
 Scaphoideus strigulatus
 Scaphoideus tergatus
 Scaphoideus testaceous
 Scaphoideus thailandensis
 Scaphoideus titanus Ball, 1932
 Scaphoideus torqus
 Scaphoideus transeus
 Scaphoideus transvittatus
 Scaphoideus trilobatus
 Scaphoideus trimaculatus
 Scaphoideus triunatus
 Scaphoideus turbinatus
 Scaphoideus umbrinus
 Scaphoideus undulatus
 Scaphoideus unimaculatus
 Scaphoideus unipunctatus
 Scaphoideus vagans
 Scaphoideus varius
 Scaphoideus varna
 Scaphoideus vaticus
 Scaphoideus veterator
 Scaphoideus vittatus
 Scaphoideus widesternanus
 Scaphoideus yingjiangensis
 Scaphoideus zangi
 Scaphoideus zhangi

References

External links 

 
 Scaphoideus at bugguide.net
 
 

Scaphoideini
Cicadellidae genera
Taxa named by Philip Reese Uhler